

Historical and architectural interest bridges

Major bridges

List by state 

 Ayeyarwady Division
 Bo Myat Tun Bridge
 Dedaye Bridge
 Kyungon Bridge
 Maubin Bridge
 Thegon Bridge
 Sonegone Bridge

 Bago Division
 Nawaday Bridge

 Kachin State
 Bala Min Htin Bridge

 Kayah State
 Thanlwin Bridge (Hpasawng) (Hpasawng Bridge)

 Kayin State
 Thanlwin Bridge (Hpa-An) (Hpa-an Bridge)
 Myanmar-Thailand Friendship Bridge
 Ayeyarwady bridge

 Chin State
 Kettel Bridge

 Rakhine 

Magwe Division
 Anawrahta Bridge
 Magwe Bridge
 Pakokku Bridge

Mandalay Division
 Irrawaddy Bridge (Yadanabon)
 U Bein Bridge (Amarapura)
 Ava Bridge

Mon State
 Thanlwin Bridge (Mawlamyaing)

Rakhine State
 Ramong Bridge
 Thazintan Pauk Bridge

Sagaing Division
 Hsinbyushin Bridge
 Monywa Bridge

Shan State
 Goteik viaduct
 Tahsan Bridge
 Takawet Bridge
 Second Myanmar-Thailand Friendship Bridge (Kenglat)
 Leinli Bridge

Tanintharyi Division

Yangon Division
 Aung Zeya Bridge
 Bayinnaung Bridge
 Dagon Bridge
 Maha Bandula Bridge
 Ngamoyeik Bridge
 Shwepyitha Bridge
 Thanlyin Bridge

Notes and References 
 Notes

 

 Others references

See also 

 Transport in Myanmar
 Rail transport in Myanmar
 List of crossings of the Mekong River
 Geography of Myanmar

External links 
  
 
 
 

Myanmar
 
Bridges
Bridges